Trance is an album by American jazz pianist and composer Steve Kuhn recorded in 1974 and released on the ECM label.

Reception 
The Allmusic review by Thom Jurek awarded the album 4 stars stating "This is jazz that touches on fusion, modal, and the new spirit of the music as ECM came into the 1970s as a player. There is restlessness and calm, tempestuousness and serenity, conflict and resolution, and -- above all -- creativity and vision".

Track listing
All compositions by Steve Kuhn.

 "Trance" - 6:03 
 "A Change of Face" - 5:03 
 "Squirt" - 3:05 
 "The Sandhouse" - 3:53 
 "Something Everywhere" - 7:52 
 "Silver" - 2:58 
 "The Young Blade" - 6:20 
 "Life's Backward Glance" - 3:09

Personnel 
 Steve Kuhn - piano, electric piano, voice
 Steve Swallow - electric bass
 Jack DeJohnette - drums
 Sue Evans - timpani, tambourine, maracas, conga, percussion

References 

ECM Records albums
Steve Kuhn albums
1975 albums
Albums produced by Manfred Eicher